Aeropetes is a monotypic butterfly genus in the family Nymphalidae. Its only species, Aeropetes tulbaghia, is commonly known as the Table Mountain beauty or mountain pride. It is native to southern Africa, where it occurs in South Africa, Lesotho, Eswatini and Zimbabwe.

Description

The sexes are similar, but males are on average smaller. The wingspan is 70–78 mm for males and 75–90 mm for females.

Habitat and habits
Aeropetes is commonly found in mountainous, rock-strewn hillsides and gullies. It has a tendency to settle on the shady side of rocks and of overhung stream banks.

Biology
The larvae feed on various Poaceae species, including Ehrharta erecta, Hyparrhenia hirta and Pennisetum clandestinum. The adults are fond of red or orange flowers, and it is the pollinator of the orchid Disa uniflora. There is one generation per year. Adults are on the wing during the austral summer, from November to April (with peaks from December to March).

Range 
The butterfly is found throughout the fynbos bio-region of South Africa, besides parts of the Nama Karoo and grassland areas in the Western and Northern Cape, Free State and Gauteng provinces of South Africa. It occurs fairly commonly along the mountain ranges of the Great Escarpment and Eastern Highlands, which includes parts of the Western and Eastern Cape, Lesotho, KwaZulu-Natal, Eswatini, Mpumalanga, Limpopo, and eastern Zimbabwe.

References

 Seitz, A. Die Gross-Schmetterlinge der Erde 13: Die Afrikanischen Tagfalter. Plate XIII 29

Melanitini
Orchid pollinators
Monotypic butterfly genera
Taxa named by Gustaf Johan Billberg